Underground is an album by Goran Bregović, with the music from the  film with the same title by Emir Kusturica. Several songs from this album, such as "Mesečina" and "Kalašnjikov", became instant-classic tavern and brass-band hits. The Boban Marković Orchestra is heavily featured in the soundtrack.

Among other pieces, "Mesečina" was performed by Keba, Trans-Siberian March Band and The Lemon Bucket Orkestra. Sezen Aksu covered "Kalašnjikov", "Ausência" and "Mesečina" in Turkish language on her 1997 Bregović-produced album Düğün ve Cenaze, titled "Kalaşnikof", "O Sensin" and "Ayışığı", respectively.

Track listing
 Kalašnjikov (cf. Kalashnikov)
 Ausência (feat. Cesária Évora)
 Mesečina / Moonlight 
 Ya Ya (Ringe Ringe Raja)
 Cajesukarije-Čoček
 Wedding‐Čoček
 War
 Underground‐Čoček
 Underground Tango
 The Belly Button of the World
 Sheva

See also
Čoček
Balkan Brass Band

Certifications

|}

References

Goran Bregović albums
2000 soundtrack albums
Comedy-drama film soundtracks
Komuna (company) albums